A lunar node is either of the two orbital nodes of the Moon, that is, the two points at which the orbit of the Moon intersects the ecliptic. The ascending (or north) node is where the Moon moves into the northern ecliptic hemisphere, while the descending (or south) node is where the Moon enters the southern ecliptic hemisphere.

Eclipses

A lunar eclipse can occur only when the full Moon is near either lunar node (within 11° 38' ecliptic longitude), while a solar eclipse can occur only when the new Moon is near either lunar node (within 17° 25').

Both solar eclipses of July 2000 (on the 1st and 31st days) occurred around the time when the Moon was at its ascending node. Ascending-node eclipses recur after one draconic year on average, which is about 0.94901 Gregorian year, as do descending-node eclipses.

Precession
(This is not the same length as a saros.) The same cycle measured against an inertial frame of reference, such as International Celestial Reference System (ICRS), a coordinate system relative to the fixed stars, is 18.599525 years.

Names and symbols

The nodes are called by different names in different cultures of the world.

In medieval texts, the nodes are referred to as ras wa dhanav al-tinnîn in Arabic. rosh ha-teli u-zenavo (ראש התלי וזנבו) in Hebrew, and caput draconis (head of the dragon) or cauda draconis (tail of the dragon) in Latin.  The ascending node is referred to as the dragon's head with the astronomical or astrological symbol of ☊ and the descending node is known as the dragon's tail with the symbol ☋.

In Hindu astronomy, the nodes are considered with the seven planets among the nine Navagrahas; the ascending node ☊ is called Rahu and the descending node ☋ is called Ketu. In Tibetan astrology (partially based on the Kalachakra Tantra) these nodes are respectively named Rahu and Kalagni.

Declination extremes

The Moon's orbit is inclined about 5.14° to the ecliptic; hence, the Moon can be up to about 5° north or south of the ecliptic. The ecliptic is inclined about 23.44° to the celestial equator, whose plane is perpendicular to the rotational axis of Earth. As a result, once during the 18.6-year nodal period (when the ascending node of the Moon's orbit coincides with the vernal equinox), the Moon's declination reaches a maximum and minimum (northern and southern extremes): about 28.6° from the celestial equator. Therefore, the moonrise or moonset azimuth has its northern- and southernmost points on the horizon; the Moon at culmination has its lowest and highest altitude (when the body transits the meridian); and first sightings of the new moon potentially have their latest times. Furthermore, occultations by the Moon of the Pleiades star cluster, which is over 4° north of the ecliptic, occur during a comparatively brief period once every nodal period.

Effect on tides
The precession of the lunar nodes has a small effect on Earth's tides – atmospheric, oceanic, or crustal.
The U.S. National Oceanic and Atmospheric Administration (NOAA) determines mean lower low water (MLLW) at a location by averaging the height of the lowest tide recorded at that location each day during a 19-year recording period, known as the National Tidal Datum Epoch. The 19-year recording period is the nearest full-year count to the 18.6-year cycle of the lunar nodes.

In conjunction with sea level rise caused by global warming, lunar nodal precession is predicted to contribute to a rapid rise in the frequency of coastal flooding throughout the 2030s.

See also
 Eclipse
 Lunar standstill
 Orbit of the Moon

References

External links
 Sun and Moon Polar Applet, showing moonrise/moonset azimuths
 Astronomy Answers: What are the standstills of the Moon? Retrieved 2016-08-26.
 Eclipses, Cosmic Clockwork of the Ancients
 Lunar and solar periods, about inertial frame of reference for measuring movements of celestial bodies.
 Mean lunar and solar periods

Orbit of the Moon
Technical factors of Western astrology
Technical factors of Hindu astrology